Guicheng Station is a metro station of Guangfo Line (FMetro Line 1) and will be an interchange station with FMetro Line 3.  It is located at the underground of the junction of Nanhai Avenue North and Nangui Road in Guicheng Subdistrict, Nanhai District, Foshan. The station is situated at the central business district of Nanhai District, near the headquarters of Nanhai municipal government. Construction started in 2007 and was completed on 3 November 2010.

Station layout

Exits

References

Foshan Metro stations
Nanhai District
Railway stations in China opened in 2010
Guangzhou Metro stations